Cristian Alejandro Marcial (born 10 January 1996) is an Argentine professional footballer who plays as a right-back for All Boys, on loan from Racing Club.

Career
Marcial began his career with Racing Club. In August 2018, Primera B Metropolitana side Fénix completed the loan signing of Marcial. He was substituted on for his professional debut on 10 September versus Almirante Brown, prior to starting for the first time a week later during a victory away to Defensores Unidos. His first goal arrived in November against Deportivo Riestra. Marcial spent 2019–20 out on loan again, this time in Primera B Nacional with Platense. He appeared five times before returning to Racing on 30 June 2020. The loan at Platense ended at the end of 2021. In February 2022, he was loaned out once again, this time to All Boys until the end of 2022.

Career statistics
.

References

External links

1996 births
Living people
People from Quilmes
Argentine footballers
Association football defenders
Primera B Metropolitana players
Primera Nacional players
Racing Club de Avellaneda footballers
Club Atlético Fénix players
Club Atlético Platense footballers
All Boys footballers
Sportspeople from Buenos Aires Province